Gerry Quinn (born 24 July 1980 in Dabrien, Kilnaboy, County Clare) is an Irish sportsperson.  He played for Corofin and was a member of the Clare senior inter-county team since 2000. He was very highly regarded member of the Clare team and was nominated for two All star awards in 2002 and 2005 He was dropped early 2009 from the Clare panel by manager Mike McNamara but was reinstated the same year by manager Ger O'Loughlin.

In August 2004, Quinn was involved in an incident that left Henry Shefflin (Kilkenny) requiring an operation. In a clash, Quinn hit Shefflin in the eye. Shefflin accepted an apology.

References

1980 births
Living people
Corofin hurlers
Clare inter-county hurlers
Munster inter-provincial hurlers